PT Mahaka Media Tbk, formerly known as Abdi Bangsa, is an Indonesian media and entertainment company founded by Erick Thohir. The group owns and operated printed newspaper and magazines (Harian Republika, Harian Indonesia, Golf Digest), and regional free to air television and radio broadcasting (JakTV, Gen FM).

History
Mahaka Media was originally founded with the name PT. Abdi Bangsa, on 28 November 1992. In 2002, Mahaka Media become a public company as it registered its shares as PT. Abdi Bangsa Tbk on 3 April 2002 in the Jakarta Stock Exchange (BEJ). In 2010, PT. Abdi Bangsa officially changed its name to PT. Mahaka Media Tbk.

In 2019, its founder and president commissioner Erick Thohir stepped down from the company to join the government as Minister of State Owned Enterprise, leaving the position he held at the company to R Harry Zulnardy.

Mahaka Group has many subsidiaries.

Business units

Publishing
 Republika
 Harian Indonesia
 Republika Penerbit

Out of home
 Mahaka Advertising
 Alive! Indonesia

Broadcasting
 Jak TV
 Alif TV
 Mahaka Radio Integra
 Gen FM
 Medan FM
 Jak FM
 Hot FM
 Most FM
 Mustang FM
 Kis FM

New media and business development
 Republika Online
 CardPlus

Company management

board of directors
President Director: Tubagus Farash Farich 
Director of Finance: Harry Danui
Director of Product and Creative Development: Ahmad Aditya
Director of Sales and Marketing: Henny M. Chandra
Director of Corporate Affair and Corporate Secretary: Agoosh Yoosran

Board of commissioners
President commissioner : Mahendra Agakhan Thohir
Commissioner: Rudy Setia Laksmana
Commissioner: Martin Suharlie
Independent commissioner: Aldo Rambie
Independent commissioner: Angkie Yudistia

References

External links
 

 
Indonesian companies established in 1992
Companies listed on the Indonesia Stock Exchange
Companies based in Jakarta
Mass media companies of Indonesia
Publishing companies of Indonesia
2002 initial public offerings
Mass media companies established in 1992